Toen 't licht verdween is a 1918 Dutch silent drama film directed by Maurits Binger.

Cast
 Annie Bos - Sylvia
 Adelqui Migliar - Pietro Cignoni
 Lola Cornero - Lyda
 Jan van Dommelen - Gio Romano
 Cor Smits - Professor in de oogheelkunde
 Frits Bouwmeester - Rosni (as Frits Bouwmeester jr.)
 Paula de Waart - Rosni's moeder
 Renee Spiljar - Renée
 Marie Spiljar - Renée's kindermeisje
 Ernst Winar

External links 
 

1918 films
Dutch silent feature films
Dutch black-and-white films
1918 drama films
Films directed by Maurits Binger
Dutch drama films
Silent drama films